Of All the Things is a 2012 Filipino romantic-comedy film starring Regine Velasquez and Aga Muhlach. The film was produced by GMA Pictures and VIVA Films. It was released on September 26, 2012. This film is Regine and Aga's third team-up after Dahil May Isang Ikaw (1999) and Pangako Ikaw Lang (2001), both produced by Viva Films.

Production

Background and development
The film was first announced in 2009 by VIVA Films. The lead actor, Aga Muhlach signed a three-movie contract and one of them was the film that reunites him with Asia's songbird Regine Velasquez after 8 years. The two previously paired up in Dahil May Isang Ikaw in 1999 and Pangako Ikaw Lang in 2001. Critically acclaimed director, Joyce E. Bernal directed the film, the one who also directed their last two movies. The film had a target play date for summer 2011, but it did not push through. The producers announced that the play date was moved to March 2012, but again it did not push through. On August 27, 2012, during the press conference that was held at the Citybest Restaurant in Quezon City, the play date of September 26, 2012, was finally announced. The movie premiered after 3 years of delay.

Filming
In 2009, it began shooting, but was stopped due to schedule conflicts with Velasquez. In 2010, after a year of hiatus, the film began filming again, but was stopped because of Velasquez preparations for her wedding with singer-songwriter Ogie Alcasid. In 2011, because of Velasquez' pregnancy, the shooting of the film had no chance to continue because of the doctor's advice for Velasquez to rest. In July 2012, months after Velasquez' giving birth, the movie resumed shooting. The filming was finished in August 2012, and Muhlach confirmed on an interview in Bombo Radyo that the showing of the movie will finally push through.

International release
The lead stars, Regine Velasquez and Aga Muhlach, in their appearance in Eat Bulaga!'s Pinoy Henyo segment, stated that the movie is going to have screenings in Guam, hinting further screenings internationally, although no confirmations have been made by the management of GMA Network nor its distribution partner, Freestyle Releasing for screenings internationally or Viva Films.

Plot
Muhlach plays the role of Umboy, a notary public attorney who earns a living by notarizing important documents and other papers.  Velasquez plays the role of Berns, a professional documents fixer. Every time Berns needs a notary public, she goes to Umboy to "legalize" her documents. Umboy is not a fan of Berns fixing documents. Their different ideology and principles in life are the causes of friction between the characters. However, with friction came attraction. How will these two get along? How will they deal with the tense attraction? See the movie and find out.

Cast
Regine Velasquez-Alcasid as Bernadette "Berns" Pamintuan
Aga Muhlach as Atty. Emilio "Umboy" Arellano
John Lapus as Rocky
Mark Bautista as Eps
Nikki Bacolod as Princess Pamintuan
Tommy Abuel as Umboy's father
Gina Pareño as Mommy Susie
Ariel Ureta as Berns' father
Joy Viado† as Mrs. Manubat
Raymond Lauchengco as Umboy's older brother
Pinky Marquez as Umboy's mothet
Miriam Quiambao as Ex-Girlfriend of Umboy
Jojo Alejar as Chief of Staff
Nikki Bacolod as Berns' sister

Box office
As of October 14, 2012, the movie earned (₱20.4 million).

References

2012 films
2010s films
Tagalog-language films
Philippine romantic comedy films
GMA Pictures films
Viva Films films
Films directed by Joyce Bernal